Lupan is a surname. Notable people with the surname include:

Andrei Lupan (1912–1992), Moldovan writer and politician
Nicolae Lupan (1921–2017), Bessarabian journalist
Vlad Lupan (born 1971), Moldovan diplomat and journalist

See also
Luman (name)

Romanian-language surnames